William George Noden  (November 30, 1898 – July 1, 1973) was a politician in Ontario, Canada. He was a Progressive Conservative member of the Legislative Assembly of Ontario from 1951 to 1967 who represented the northern Ontario riding of Rainy River.

Background
He was born in Sand Point Lake, Ontario, on the border of the U.S. state of Minnesota and Ontario. From 1926 to 1958, Noden was the co-owner the Gillmor-Noden Hardware Store on Scott, the main street in Fort Frances. He was a Mason and a member of Granite Lodge #446.

Politics
Noden ran as the Progressive Conservative candidate in the 1951 provincial election. He defeated Liberal-Labour incumbent James Newman by 452 votes. He was re-elected three times before retiring in 1967. He sat as a backbench supporter of the governments of Leslie Frost and John Robarts. In recognition of his public service, the three and a half mile causeway linking Rainy River to Atikokan and carrying Ontario Highway 11, was named the "Noden Causeway," which opened on June 28, 1965, while Noden was still an MPP.

References

External links 
 

1973 deaths
1898 births
Progressive Conservative Party of Ontario MPPs